Andrew Edgar Francis Metcalfe,  (born 1959) is a senior Australian public servant and policymaker currently appointed as the Secretary of the Department of Agriculture, Fisheries and Forestry. He is a Fellow of the Institute of Public Administration Australia and Fellow of the Australian Institute of Management. He was a Partner at Ernst and Young, Canberra in its Government and Public Sector team from 2014-19.

Background and early life
Andrew Metcalfe was born and raised in Toowoomba, Queensland. He attended Rangeville State School and Toowoomba Grammar School and was dux of Toowoomba Grammar in 1976. He then earned a Bachelor of Arts in 1980, and a Bachelor of Laws in 1985 from the University of Queensland.

Public service career
Andrew Metcalfe joined the Australian Public Service as an Administrative Trainee in 1980, assigned to the Public Service Board, in Canberra. In 1981, he transferred to the Department of Immigration and Ethnic Affairs  until 1989 when in September, he was appointed Regional Director for Immigration, and Consul, Australian Consulate-General, Hong Kong until May 1993.

Upon his return to Canberra, he was appointed Assistant Secretary, Legal Branch at the Department of Immigration and Ethnic Affairs until April 1996. He served as the Chief of Staff to the then Minister for Immigration, the Hon Philip Ruddock MP from April until December 1997, whereupon he returned to the department as a First Assistant Secretary. He was promoted to Deputy Secretary and then appointed Deputy Secretary of the Department of the Prime Minister and Cabinet in August 2002, with responsibilities for the coordination of policy advice to the Prime Minister on international affairs, national security and machinery of government issues. He was the inaugural chair of the Commonwealth/State/Territory National Counter Terrorism Committee.

John Howard appointed Andrew Metcalfe Secretary of the Department of Immigration and Multicultural and Indigenous Affairs in July 2005. Metcalfe stayed on as the Department transitioned, first becoming the Department of Immigration and Multicultural Affairs and later the Department of Immigration and Citizenship. He defended the often-criticised Gillard Government Malaysia Solution during his time in the Department of Immigration and Citizenship. During his time as Secretary of Immigration, he Chaired the Commonwealth/State/Territory Standing Committee on Immigration and Multicultural Affairs (2005–12) and of the Five Countries (Australia, New Zealand, United States, Canada and the UK) Conference (2007, 2011).

Metcalfe was appointed Secretary of the Department of Agriculture, Fisheries and Forestry, beginning January 2013. He was one of three public service heads relieved of their commissions by the Abbott Government after the 2013 federal election.

He was reappointed Secretary of the Department of Agriculture, Water and the Environment on 5 December, 2019 with effect from 1 February 2020. He served in this position until 30 June 2022, when the department was renamed to the Department of Agriculture, Fisheries and Forestry on July 1, 2022. Metcalfe kept his role and is currently the Secretary of the Department of Agriculture, Fisheries and Forestry.

Honours and awards
Metcalfe was named the 2010 "Federal Government Leader of the Year", awarded by the Australian Institute of Chartered Accountants.

In January 2012 Metcalfe was appointed as an Officer of the Order of Australia (AO) in the Australia Day Honours List for "distinguished service to public sector leadership through contributions to Australia's international relations and to major public policy development and implementation in the areas of immigration, Australian citizenship, cultural diversity, and national security; and to the community".

In September 2012 Metcalfe was made a National Fellow of the Institute of Public Administration Australia, an organisation of which he was the ACT President from 2009 to 2013. He is also a Fellow of the Australian Institute of Management.

Public service leadership
Metcalfe is a highly experienced public administrator and public policy expert, strongly committed to public service. He transformed the then-Department of Immigration, Multicultural and Indigenous Affairs following his appointment in 2005 as Secretary in the wake of the Cornelia Rau and Vivian Alvarez scandals, successfully and positively reforming its culture and operations.

He has worked extensively on the international stage, particularly with the immigration authorities in many countries in Asia; and with Canada, New Zealand, the United Kingdom and the United States when he chaired the Five Countries Conference of immigration authorities in 2007 and 2011.

During his time as Deputy Secretary in the Department of the Prime Minister and Cabinet, he led the coordination of all policy advice to the Prime Minister on international affairs, national security, and machinery of government matters, as well as being the inaugural chair of the National Counter Terrorism Committee, comprising Federal and State deputy police commissioners and deputy heads of Premiers’ and Chief Ministers’ departments; and senior representatives from ASIO, the Special Operations Command of the Department of Defence, and other Commonwealth departments.

He was also a member of several government boards, most notably as a member of the National Australia Day Council (2002-2012); the Administrative Review Council (2002-2012); and the Council of the Order of Australia (2002-2005). He was the longest-serving President of the Institute of Public Administration (ACT), a White Ribbon Ambassador, the Patron of Expand (a public sector organisation for Executive Assistants), Patron of the Gundaroo Bush Festival, and a volunteer technical official for Swimming NSW/ACT.  Metcalfe was appointed as a Partner with Ernst & Young in their Canberra operation on February 6, 2014, joining its Government and Public Sector team. Ernst & Young's Canberra managing Partner, Lucille Halloran described Metcalfe, in her announcement, as "an inspirational leader with in-depth knowledge of the Australian and international public sectors (who) brings extensive experience and insights about the important relationship between business, the community and governments".

Board and Council memberships
Chair (and briefly Deputy Chair) of the National Youth Science Forum 2015-20
National Australia Day Council 2002–12
Administrative Review Council 2002–12
Australian Multicultural Council since 2011
Council of the Order of Australia 2002–05
DesignGov 2013
Strategic Centre for Leadership, Learning and Development 2013
President of the Institute of Public Administration (ACT) 2009–13
National Drought and North Queensland Flood Response and Recovery Advisory Board 2020

Notes

References and further reading

 
 

Australian public servants
Living people
1959 births
Officers of the Order of Australia
Secretaries of the Australian Government Immigration Department